Muhammad Ashraf is a publisher and distributor of Sunni Islamic literature based in Lahore, Pakistan.

Specialization

Ashraf publishes solely Sunni Islamic religious work and was associated with the Darul Uloom Deoband madrasah and the movement that arose there, the Deobandi.

Translations

Ashraf was the original publisher of the Abdullah Yusuf Ali translation of the Koran, The Holy Qur'an: Text, Translation and Commentary, famous for its copious missionary and apologetic footnotes (over 1200 pages), which for a long time has been used among English-speaking Muslims. An edited version of this Yusuf Ali translation was also subsidised for a brief period by the Saudi government.

References 

Living people
Pakistani book publishers (people)
Pakistani translators
Pakistani Islamists
Year of birth missing (living people)